The 2019-20 Malian Première Division was the 53rd season of the highest level of professional football in Mali, and the first complete season since the 2016 season. The championship was contested by 23 teams between August 2019 and September 2020. The championship was interrupted after 21 matchdays in March 2020 by the COVID-19 pandemic, and resumed in August 2020 with the 22nd and final matchday, along with the championship and relegation play-offs. Stade Malien won their 22nd title and equalled Djoliba AC's record.

Overview
The league was expanded from the abandoned 2017 season, with the bottom four teams (JS Centre Salif Keita, CS Duguwolofila, AS Nianan and Sonni AC) getting a reprieve, two teams being promoted from the 2017-18 Tournoi de Montée (Yeelen Olympique and AS Performance) and three of the four teams relegated in 2016 season (AS Police, AS Avenir,  and AS Sabana), leading to an increase from 18 teams to 23 teams. The league was divided into two pools to accommodate this increase, and within each pool every team played each other home and away. The top two in each pool qualified for the Championship Play-Off, while the bottom four were put into the Relegation Play-off. 

Djoliba AC and Stade Malien took their respective pools by storm, with each team having a draw and no losses at the halfway point of the main stage. Stade Malien remained unbeaten for the remainder of this phase and only dropped six points in their twenty games, finishing 15 points clear of second-placed Yeelen Olympique and 18 ahead of Onze Créateurs in third. Yeelen Olympique defied the odds by qualifying for the Championship play-off in their first-ever season in the Malian top flight. In the other pool, 20-time champions Djoliba AC and 6-time champions AS Real Bamako finished the main phase in the top two and qualified for the play-off. 

After a 5-month break due to the COVID-19 situation, several teams refused to participate on the final match day and any postseason competition. Moussa Konaté, president of Cercle Olympique de Bamako was reported to say "We objectively believe that Femafoot does not have the means to enforce the sanitary measures decreed by the Scientific Committee (...) Besides, this championship is marred by irregularities due to the lack of independent commissions. Playing the championship without these commissions, it's like playing a match without the referee." Djoliba AC, Mamahira AC, AS Avenir, JS Centre Salif Keita, CS Duguwolofila, AS Bamako and Cercle Olympique de Bamako were later fined 20,000 CFA francs each for refusing to play their final regular season matches. 

The championship play-off (Carré d'As in French) was planned to be played between the top two teams in each pool. However, Djoliba AC forfeited the play-off before it started, leaving the other three to play a three-way 'home and away' round-robin, although every match was played at the Stade du 26 Mars in Bamako. Stade Malien won their first three games (1-0 and 3-0 against Yeelen, 1-0 against AS Real) and thus became champions with a game to spare. Yeelen Olympique beat AS Real Bamako 2-1 and 1-0 to secure second place and a berth in the 2020-21 CAF Confederation Cup in only their first season in the Premiere Division.

At the other end of the table, the four bottom teams in each pool were forced into the Relegation Play-Off. These were AS Bamako, AS Avenir, AS Performance and Mamahira AC from Pool A, and AS Olympique de Messira, JS Centre Salif Keita, AS Sabana and US Bougouni from Pool B. From these, AS Avenir, AS Bamako, JS Centre Salif Keita and Mamahira AC withdrew from the play-off, leaving four teams to fight for two survival spots. US Bougouni reversed their fortunes from the main phase and won all three matches without conceding a goal, and AS Olympique de Messira beat AS Sabana and AS Performance to grab the second spot, condemning the latter to relegation together with the previously-withdrawn teams.

Main Stage

Pool A

Pool B

Play-Offs

Championship play-off

Relegation play-off

References

Malian Première Division seasons